The dorsal radiocarpal ligament (posterior ligament) is less thick and strong than its volar counterpart, and has a proximal attachment to the posterior border of the distal radius. Its fibers run medially and inferiorly to form a distal attachment at the dorsal surfaces of the scaphoid (navicular bone of the hand), lunate, and triquetral.

The fibres of the dorsal radiocarpal ligament blend with those of the dorsal intercarpal ligament.

It is in relation, behind, with the Extensor tendons of the fingers; in front, it is blended with the articular disk.

External links
 

This article was originally based on an entry from a public domain edition of Gray's Anatomy. As such, some of the information contained herein may be outdated. Please edit the article if this is the case, and feel free to remove this notice when it is no longer relevant.

Ligaments of the upper limb